Drillia asra is a species of sea snail, a marine gastropod mollusk in the family Drilliidae.

Distribution
This species occurs in the demersal zone of the Indian Ocean off Zanzibar, found at a depths of 463 m.

References

  Tucker, J.K. 2004 Catalog of recent and fossil turrids (Mollusca: Gastropoda). Zootaxa 682:1–1295

External links

asra
Gastropods described in 1925